Judge Holden is a purported historical person, a murderer who partnered with John Joel Glanton as a professional scalp-hunter in Mexico and the American South-West during the mid-19th century. To date, the only source for Holden's existence is Samuel Chamberlain's My Confession: Recollections of a Rogue, an autobiographical account of Chamberlain's life as a soldier during the Mexican–American War. Chamberlain described Holden as well-spoken, intelligent, and physically quite large, as well as perhaps the most ruthless of the roving band of mercenaries led by Glanton, with whom Chamberlain briefly traveled after the war. Holden, Chamberlain describes, "had a fleshy frame, [and] a dull tallow colored face destitute of hair and all expression."

Chamberlain makes it very clear that he strongly disliked Holden: "I hated him at first sight, and he knew it," Chamberlain wrote. "Yet nothing could be more gentle and kind than his deportment towards me; he would often seek conversation with me." 

He was popularized as the main antagonist of Cormac McCarthy's novel Blood Meridian (1985), where he is described as "a massive, hairless, albino man who excels in shooting, languages, horsemanship, dancing, music, drawing, diplomacy, science and anything else he seems to put his mind to. He is also the chief proponent and philosopher of the Glanton gang’s lawless warfare."

Historical basis
In Samuel Chamberlain's autobiographical My Confession, he describes Holden:

The second in command, now left in charge of the camp, was a man of gigantic size called "Judge" Holden of Texas. Who or what he was no one knew but a cooler blooded villain never went unhung; he stood six feet six in his moccasins, had a large fleshy frame, a dull tallow colored face destitute of hair and all expression. His desires was blood and women, and terrible stories were circulated in camp of horrid crimes committed by him when bearing another name, in the Cherokee nation and Texas; and before we left Fronteras a little girl of ten years was found in the chapperal, foully violated and murdered. The mark of a huge hand on her little throat pointed him out as the ravisher as no other man had such a hand, but though all suspected, no one charged him with the crime.

Holden was by far the best educated man in northern Mexico; he conversed with all in their own language, spoke in several Indian lingos, at a fandango would take the Harp or the Guitar from the hands of the musicians and charm all with his wonderful performance and out-waltz any poblana of the ball. He was “plum center” with a rifle or revolver, a daring horseman, acquainted with the nature of all the strange plants and their botanical names, great in geology and mineralogy, in short another Admirable Crichton, and with all an arrant coward.

Not but that he possessed enough courage to fight Indians and Mexicans or anyone else where he had the advantage in strength, skill, and weapons. But where the combat would be equal, he would avoid it if possible. I hated him at first sight and he knew it, yet nothing could be more gentle and kind than his deportment towards me: He would often seek conversation with me and speak of Massachusetts and to my astonishment I found he knew more about Boston than I did.

Some amateur historians have interpreted the name "Judge Holden" as a pseudonym, and hoped to establish his true identity. Popular candidates include Charles Wilkins Webber, an educated man in the region who once used the pseudonym "Holden".

Blood Meridian

A fictionalized Holden is a central character in Cormac McCarthy's 1985 Western novel Blood Meridian. In the novel, he and Glanton are the leaders of a pack of nomadic criminals who rob, rape, torture, and kill across the borderlands between the United States and Mexico. Throughout the novel, Holden brutally murders dozens of people, including children. Searching for additional evidence for Holden's existence has been a hobby for some Cormac McCarthy scholars.

As depicted in Blood Meridian, Holden is a mysterious figure, a cold-blooded killer, and, it is implied, a child-rapist; aside from the children he openly kills, he is seen enticing children with sweets, and a child often goes missing when he is in the vicinity. At one point in the novel, he is seen naked with a naked twelve-year-old girl in his room. Holden displays knowledge of paleontology, archaeology, linguistics, law, technical drawing, geology, chemistry, prestidigitation, and philosophy.

He is massive in frame, enormously strong, an excellent musician and dancer, a fine draftsman, exceptionally articulate and persuasive in several languages, and an unerring marksman. His skin is so pale as to have almost no pigment. This strange appearance, as well as his keen, extremely fast reflexes, strength, agility, apparent immunity to sleep and aging, and multifarious other abilities point to his being something other than a normal human. In the final pages of the novel, McCarthy makes more direct reference to the Judge as a supernatural entity, or even as a concept personified.

In 2002, Book magazine rated Holden as the 43rd greatest character in fiction since 1900. He is regarded as one of the greatest characters of modern literature, likened to a "Captain Ahab of the desert." Harold Bloom described him as "short of Moby Dick, the most monstrous apparition in all of American literature." Holden has been characterized as " the most haunting character in American literature."

Scholarly debate
In his essay "Gravers False and True: Blood Meridian as Gnostic Tragedy", literature professor Leo Daugherty argued that McCarthy's Holden is—or at least embodies—a gnostic archon (a kind of demon). Harold Bloom, who declared Judge Holden to be "the most frightening figure in all of American literature", even came to regard him as immortal. However, unlike Daugherty, Bloom argues that Holden defies identification as being under any "system" such as Gnosticism, citing the passage in the book stating that there was no "system by which to divide [him] back into his origins". Rather, Bloom "resort[s]" to literary comparison with Shakespeare's Iago, a methodical dispenser of strife. Todd has written of Holden representing a radically figurative notion of evil who stakes a claim against the natural order of the universe.

References

Characters in American novels of the 20th century
Cormac McCarthy characters
Fictional characters with albinism
Fictional characters with gigantism
Fictional demons and devils
Fictional gang members
Fictional gangsters
Fictional mercenaries
Fictional murderers of children
Fictional pedophiles
Fictional rapists
Fictional serial killers
Literary characters introduced in 1985
Male literary villains
People whose existence is disputed
Western (genre) outlaws